Hannes Arch (22 September 1967 – 8 September 2016) was an Austrian pilot who competed in the Red Bull Air Race World Championship from 2007 to 2016. Arch won the World Championship in the 2008 season.

Early life
Hannes Arch was born in Leoben, Austria in 1967.

Death
Hannes Arch died on 8 September 2016 in a helicopter crash in the Austrian Alps during a helicopter supply flight to a remote mountain lodge, the Elberfelder Hut. Shortly after takeoff at about 9:15 p.m., the helicopter struck the side of a mountain. Arch died of a broken neck, a passenger survived the crash. Arch was accompanied in the helicopter by the mountain hut's owner Reinhard B., a 62-year-old German who ran the Alpine hut which Arch had delivered supplies to. The German was seriously injured in the crash but survived.

Hannes Arch was buried at a funeral attended by his closest relatives in Trofaiach on 13 September 2016.

Red Bull X-Alps 
Hannes made his mark on the paragliding scene inventing the grueling international competition known as the Red Bull X-Alps, taking the world's most elite paragliding pilots across the Alps from Austria to Monaco entirely by air or foot in a race against the clock. The event quickly gained a reputation as one of the world's toughest adventure races.

Red Bull Air Race Results

Legend:
 CAN: Cancelled
 DNP: Did not participate
 DNQ: Did not qualify
 DNS: Did not show
 DQ: Disqualified
 NC: Not classified

See also
 Competition aerobatics

References

External links

 Air-races.com profile
 Aerobatics website with Hannes Arch videos
 Red Bull Air Race World Series official website

1967 births
2016 deaths
Aerobatic pilots
Austrian aviators
Austrian air racers
Red Bull Air Race World Championship pilots
Red Bull Air Race World Championship winners
People from Leoben
Victims of aviation accidents or incidents in Austria
Sportspeople from Styria